Marcus Di Rollo (born 31 March 1978 in Edinburgh) is a retired Scottish rugby union footballer. He played as a centre for Toulouse, Edinburgh, and the Scottish national team.

After moving from Edinburgh to Toulouse, Di Rollo endured a difficult time at the club. He only ever played one minute for the club due to conflicting medical opinions over a heart murmur he has carried since birth and left after a season. After a difficult season he returned to play for Scotland A in 2008.

Marcus Di Rollo was not favoured by the former Scotland national rugby union coach Matt Williams despite the support of respected Scottish rugby commentators such as Allan Massie. But under Frank Hadden, Di Rollo became a regular fixture in the national team.

Di Rollo earned his first cap as a second-half substitute in the 65–23 victory against the USA on the 2002 summer tour. He also made a try-scoring debut in the uncapped game against the Barbarians in May 2001 with an interception try. Scotland were grateful for the intervention of Marcus Di Rollo in the Autumn Test against Samoa in November 2005. The Scots were being held 11–11 by the Pacific Islanders when the then Edinburgh Gunners centre crossed over the line for his first try in the late win.

In 2010, Di Rollo was appointed head coach at Watsonians RFC.

Tournaments
2006 Six Nations (4 appearances)
2007 Six Nations (4+1 appearances)
2007 Rugby World Cup (2 appearances)

References

External links
Scrum profile
Its Rugby profile

1978 births
Living people
Scottish rugby union players
Scotland international rugby union players
People educated at George Watson's College
Rugby union centres
Edinburgh Rugby players
Stade Toulousain players
Italian Scottish rugby union players
Rugby union players from Edinburgh